Joshua McKenzie Dickson (born 2 November 1994) is a New Zealand rugby union player who currently plays as a lock for  in New Zealand's domestic National Provincial Championship (NPC) and for the  in the international Super Rugby competition.

Early career

Born in Perth, Western Australia, Dickson was raised in New Zealand and attended Otago Boys' High School.

Senior career

Dickson made 50 games for Otago in 2019.

Super Rugby

Solid performances for Otago over the course of three provincial seasons put him on the radar of 2015 Super Rugby champions, the Highlanders, and he was signed to a contract with the franchise ahead of the 2017 season.

International

Dickson was a member of the New Zealand Under 20 side which competed in the 2014 IRB Junior World Championship in his home country where he made 2 appearances as the Junior All Blacks finished in 3rd place.

References

External links

1994 births
Living people
New Zealand rugby union players
Rugby union locks
Rugby union flankers
Otago rugby union players
People educated at Otago Boys' High School
Australian emigrants to New Zealand
Otago Polytechnic alumni
Highlanders (rugby union) players
Māori All Blacks players
Rugby union players from Perth, Western Australia